New Zealand political leader Phil Goff assembled a "shadow cabinet" after his election to the positions of Leader of the Labour Party and Leader of the Opposition in 2008 unopposed.

The shadow cabinet was mostly made up of New Zealand members of Parliament of the Labour Party; however, Progressive Party leader and sole MP Jim Anderton, who had been in coalition with Labour in the previous Government remained aligned to Labour in Opposition, as the Opposition Agriculture spokesperson.

Frontbench team

2011
By the 2011 general election, the Opposition spokespersons were as follows:

2008
At the time of announcement, the Opposition spokespersons were as follows:

References

New Zealand Labour Party
Goff, Phil
2008 in New Zealand
2008 establishments in New Zealand
2011 disestablishments in New Zealand